MC Alger, an Algerian professional association football club, has gained entry to Confederation of African Football (CAF) competitions on several occasions. They have represented Algeria in the Champions League on seven occasions, the Confederation Cup on four separate occasions, the now-defunct Cup Winners' Cup only one occasion.

History

CAF competitions

Non-CAF competitions

Statistics by country
Statistics correct as of game against Wydad AC on May 22, 2021

CAF competitions

Non-CAF competitions

Statistics

By season
Information correct as of 22 May 2021 2021.
Key

Pld = Played
W = Games won
D = Games drawn
L = Games lost
F = Goals for
A = Goals against
Grp = Group stage

PR = Preliminary round
R1 = First round
R2 = Second round
SR16 = Second Round of 16
R16 = Round of 16
QF = Quarter-final
SF = Semi-final

Key to colours and symbols:

By competition

In Africa
:

Non-CAF competitions
:

African competitions goals
Statistics correct as of game against Wydad AC on May 22, 2021

Hat-tricks

Two goals one match

Non-CAF competitions goals

List of All-time appearances
This List of All-time appearances for MC Alger in African competitions contains football players who have played for MC Alger in African football competitions and have managed to accrue 15 or more appearances. As well as participating in UAFA Club Championship for those who have exceeded the limit of 15 African matches only.

Gold Still playing competitive football in MC AlgerStatistics correct as of game against Wydad AC on May 22, 2021

African and arab opponents by cities

References

Africa
Algerian football clubs in international competitions